Little Tahoma Peak, also called Little Tahoma, is a satellite peak of Mount Rainier in Pierce County, Washington and in Mount Rainier National Park.

Little Tahoma Peak is a volcanic remnant.  It was part of a larger Mount Rainier which has  eroded. The rock is quite unstable and in 1963 a large avalanche originating below it covered the lower section of Emmons Glacier with rock debris. The Fryingpan Glacier and Whitman Glacier are located just to the east of the peak.

Little Tahoma Peak can most easily be accessed from Summerland, an alpine meadow area in Mount Rainier National Park. The first recorded ascent was on August 29, 1894, by JB Flett and Henry H. Garrison who climbed from Summerland using the east shoulder.

If considered on its own, Little Tahoma would be the third-highest peak in Washington.

References

External links
 

Mountains of Pierce County, Washington
Mount Rainier